Sortable list of commissioned vessels of the Royal New Zealand Navy from its formation on 1 October 1941 to the present. It does not include vessels of the New Zealand Division (1921–1941) or New Zealand Naval Forces (1913–21) or earlier vessels up to 1913.

See also 
 Current Royal New Zealand Navy ships

References 
 Walters, Sydney David (1956) The Royal New Zealand Navy, Official History, Department of Internal Affairs, Wellington Online
 McDougall, R J  (1989) New Zealand Naval Vessels. Government Printing Office. 
 Royal New Zealand Navy Official web site

 
Ships of the Royal New Zealand Navy
New Zealand